Anthony Donald Laster (born December 13, 1958) is a former American football offensive lineman in the National Football League (NFL) for the Washington Redskins and the Detroit Lions.  He played college football at Tennessee State University and was drafted in the twelfth round of the 1982 NFL Draft.

1958 births
Living people
Sportspeople from Albany, Georgia
American football offensive tackles
Tennessee State Tigers football players
Washington Redskins players
Detroit Lions players
Players of American football from Georgia (U.S. state)